The 1924 Mercer Bears football team was an American football team that represented Mercer University as a member of the Southern Intercollegiate Athletic Association (SIAA) during the 1924 college football season. In their second year under head coach Stanley L. Robinson, the team compiled a 5–3–2 record.

Schedule

References

Mercer
Mercer Bears football seasons
Mercer Bears football